Owen Power (born November 22, 2002) is a Canadian professional ice hockey defenceman for the Buffalo Sabres of the National Hockey League (NHL). He played college ice hockey for the University of Michigan. Power was drafted first overall by the Sabres in the 2021 NHL Entry Draft.

Playing career
Power grew up in Mississauga, Ontario. When he became eligible as a junior player, he was selected by the Flint Firebirds of the Ontario Hockey League in the second round of the 2018 OHL draft and by the Chicago Steel of the United States Hockey League (USHL) in the first round of the 2018 USHL draft. He opted to join the Steel to retain his NCAA eligibility as he had already verbally committed to playing for the University of Michigan. As a rookie with the Steel in the 2018–19 season, he was named to the end-of-season All-Rookie Second Team as the Steel advanced to the Clark Cup finals. He was then the 2019–20 USHL Defenceman of the Year and led the league's defenceman with 40 points as the Steel earned the regular season title in the COVID-19 pandemic-shortened season.

He then joined the University of Michigan for the 2020–21 season, which ended with the team being forced to withdraw from the postseason due to positive tests for COVID-19. He was considered one of the top prospects for the 2021 NHL Entry Draft. He was selected for the Hockey Canada selection camp.

Power was selected first overall in the 2021 NHL Entry Draft by the Buffalo Sabres, though he elected to return to Michigan for his sophomore season, becoming the first number one overall pick to play college ice hockey since Erik Johnson in 2006. During the 2021–22 season in his sophomore year, he recorded three goals and 24 assists for 27 points in 29 games. He also had a team-best 44 blocked shots. Before leaving for the Olympics, he led the nation's defenseman in points per game. Following an outstanding season, he was named to the All-Big Ten First Team and was named a finalist for the Big Ten Defensive Player of the Year. He was also named an AHCA West Second Team All-American. 

On April 8, 2022, Power signed a $5.55 million three-year, entry-level contract with the Sabres. Power made his NHL debut on April 12, 2022, in a 5–2 win over the Toronto Maple Leafs. He recorded his first point, an assist on a goal by Alex Tuch, two days later on April 14 in a 6–2 loss to the St. Louis Blues. Power scored his first NHL goal on April 21 in a 5–2 win over the New Jersey Devils; he recorded one more in the Sabres' season finale against the Chicago Blackhawks.

International play

Power represented Canada at the 2021 IIHF World Championship, where he recorded three assists in 10 games and won a gold medal. He also represented Canada at the 2022 World Junior Ice Hockey Championships. During the first game of the preliminary round of December 26, 2021, he became the first Canadian defenceman in World Juniors history to score a hat-trick.

On January 25, 2022, Power was named to Team Canada's roster to represent Canada at the 2022 Winter Olympics.

Personal life
Power has an older sister, Emily, who plays lacrosse at the University of Guelph, and a younger brother, Adam. In high school, Power also played basketball, volleyball, and lacrosse. He was a three-time national champion in lacrosse. He has stated that lacrosse helped him in hockey, as he would learn how to find space in the attacking zone.

Career statistics

Regular season and playoffs

International

Awards and honours

References

External links
 

2002 births
Living people
AHCA Division I men's ice hockey All-Americans
Buffalo Sabres draft picks
Buffalo Sabres players
Canadian ice hockey defencemen
Chicago Steel players
Ice hockey people from Ontario
Michigan Wolverines men's ice hockey players
National Hockey League first-overall draft picks
National Hockey League first-round draft picks
Sportspeople from Mississauga
Ice hockey players at the 2022 Winter Olympics
Olympic ice hockey players of Canada